The Bor S. Luh International Award has been awarded every year since 1956. Before 2005, this award was named the International Award. It is given to an individual or institution that had outstanding efforts in one of the following areas in food technology: 1) International exchange of ideas, 2) better international understanding, and/or 3) practical successful technology transfer to an economically depressed area in a developed or developing area.

The award was renamed for Bor S. Luh (1916-2001), who was born and educated in China before completing his education in the United States. Luh was the first president of the Chinese American Food Society in 1974-5 and received its Professional Achievement Award in 1984.

Award winners receive a plaque from the Bor S. Luh Endowment Fund of the Institute of Food Technologists Foundation and a USD 3000 honorarium.

Winners

References

List of past winners - Official site
Information on Bor S. Luh 

Food technology awards